Curtis Lee Hanson (March 24, 1945 – September 20, 2016) was an American film director, screenwriter, and producer. Born in Reno, Nevada, Hanson grew up in Los Angeles. After dropping out of high school, Hanson worked as photographer and editor for Cinema magazine. In the 1970s, Hanson got involved in filmmaking starting with participating to the writing Daniel Haller's The Dunwich Horror (1970) and his directorial debut Sweet Kill (1973), where he lacked creative control to fulfill his vision. While Hanson continued directing, he rose to prominence by being involved in the writing of critically acclaimed films. This includes  Daryl Duke's The Silent Partner (1978), Samuel Fuller's White Dog and Carroll Ballard's Never Cry Wolf (1983).

Moving forward, Hanson's directorial efforts started to get some attention with The Bedroom Window (1987), and Bad Influence (1990). Eventually, he had a breakthrough with The Hand That Rocks the Cradle (1992), which made $140 million at the box-office. Afterwards Hanson had a streak of generally well reviewed and commercially successful films The River Wild (1994), L.A. Confidential (1997), Wonder Boys (2000), 8 Mile (2002), and In Her Shoes (2005).

For his work of L.A. Confidential, Hanson won the Academy Award for Best Adapted Screenplay in 1998, for co-writing  with Brian Helgeland, along with additional nominations for Best Picture, Best Director, and for winning the Palme d'Or at the 1997 Cannes Film Festival.

Up until 2014, Hanson continued to produce and direct. During this time, he fell ill and it led him to retire. Hanson died of natural causes in 2016.

Early life 
Hanson was born in Reno, Nevada, and grew up in Los Angeles. He was the son of Beverly June Curtis, a real estate agent, and Wilbur Hale "Bill" Hanson, a teacher. Hanson dropped out of high school, finding work as a freelance photographer and editor for Cinema magazine.

Film career

1970 to 1982: early writing and directing efforts 
In 1970, Hanson is listed among the writers of Daniel Haller's The Dunwich Horror, a film adaptation of H.P. Lovecraft's short story.  

In 1973, Hanson wrote and directed his first feature, Sweet Kill starring Tab Hunter. The film came about when Dunwhich Horror was finished and Hanson approached the executive producer Roger Corman, about the possibility of writing and directing a film for him. Corman replied he might also be interested in a modern horror film along the lines of Psycho (1960).  Hanson wrote the script originally with the killer as a female. Corman liked it but felt it was "a little too different" for the killer to be female so asked she be turned male. According to Hanson, the film cost $130,000 and Corman was supposed to put up two-thirds of the money. After Corman decided to only put up a third, Hanson said "I went to my parents and persuaded them to put a mortgage on their home in order to finance this film." After creative interference from Corman, Hanson later described the experience as a "very unhappy" one.  

That same year, Hanson, with the pseudonym Edward Collins, shot a film called And God Bless Grandma and Grandpa. Producer Peter S. Traynor wanted to shoot new scenes. Which he did with actor Dean Jagger, in 1974, who played a character named "Dr. Shagetz." It was renamed God Bless Dr. Shagetz. In 1975, a litigation started between Traynor and the film's financial investors. It is rumored that with the name God Bless Dr. Shagetz, it had limited released in 1977. In 1983, a producer named Mardi Rustam, bought the films rights and shot new footage. In 1985, Rusham's version was released as a direct to video title name Evil Town.  

In 1978, Hanson wrote and was an associate producer for Daryl Duke's  Canadian film The Silent Partner. The Silent Partner did well in Canada both critically and financially, winning several Canadian Film Academy Awards including Best Picture and Best Director. The film was a sleeper upon its US release, with Brendon Hanley of the film database Allmovie noting that the film"...stands out as one of the best sleepers of the late '70s". 

In 1980, Hanson directed The Little Dragons starring Chris and Pat Petersen. 

In 1982, Hanson was among the screenwriters of Samuel Fuller's White Dog. The film depicts the struggle of a dog trainer named, who is black, trying to retrain a stray dog trained to make vicious attacks upon, and to kill, any black person. White Dog was a 1970 novel, whose story was purchased for use by Paramount in 1975, with Hanson selected to write the screenplay and Roman Polanski hired to direct. Before shooting commenced, Polanski had legal problems, leaving the production in limbo. Over a span of six years, the project was given to various writers and producers. By 1981, Hanson, back on board as the film's screenwriter, suggested that Samuel Fuller be named the film's director as he felt Fuller was the only one available with the experience needed to complete the film on short notice, while still doing so responsibly with regard to the sensitive material. The film was praised by critics, particularly for its treatment of racism and Fuller's directorial talents.

1983 to 1994: rise to prominence and breakthrough 
In 1983, Hanson directed Losin' It, a comedy starring Tom Cruise, about young teenagers going to Mexico to visit a brothel.  The film received negative reviews from critics. It has an 18% score on Rotten Tomatoes based on 11 reviews. It opened in 180 theatres in New York and Los Angeles opening w $437,257 for the weekend it grossed domestically $1,246,141.

That same year he was credited among the writers of Carroll Ballard's Never Cry Wolf. The review aggregation website Rotten Tomatoes gives the film a score of 100% based on reviews from eighteen critics, with an average rating of 7.7 out of 10.  The film grossed in the US $27,668,764. 

In 1986, Hanson directed the made-for-television crime drama film The Children of Times Square. 

In 1987, Hanson directed The Bedroom Window starring Steve Guttenberg, Isabelle Huppert, and Elizabeth McGovern. The film came about, when he read the novel The Witness by Anne Holden and tried to get the film rights. Already bought by Paramount, Hanson made a deal with them. Hanson says McGovern was his "only choice" for the part of Denise. Hanson decided to cast French actress Huppert for a part of an American character, who felt she added sophistication to the role. Hanson says Guttenberg was not his first choice for the lead but rather a suggestion by producer Dino De Laurentiis, due to his popularity in comedies. Hanson agreed to cast Guttenberg, when he saw the actor's enthusiasm, and his eagerness to escape typecast. Upon its original release, the film received mixed reviews from other film critics. As of April 2021, the film holds a 70% rating on Rotten Tomatoes with the consensus: "A likable cast and mostly solid story..." 

In 1990, Hanson directed Bad Influence, starring Rob Lowe and James Spader. Hanson stated that the film bears similarities to his earlier movies, The Silent Partner and The Bedroom Window. He said all are about a "character who takes a step out of line. In these pictures the guy is very guilty ... and his guilt gets him in deeper and deeper. Because he's guilty he pays a terrible price, but we feel better because he paid that price and he ends up with a strict moral code he didn't have at the start of the picture." During rehearsals, a sex scandal story broke about Lowe. "I don't believe in the theory that any publicity is good," said Hanson. "For Rob's sake and the picture's sake, I wish it had never happened. The story broke shortly before rehearsals and my reaction was completely selfish. I kept wondering, 'How does this affect the movie? How does it affect his performance?' It was like a carnival atmosphere around him." Bad Influence received mixed to positive reviews from critics. It holds a 65% rating on Rotten Tomatoes based on 20 reviews. 

In 1992 Hanson directed The Hand That Rocks the Cradle. The film opened on January 10, 1992, and grossed $7.7 million in its opening weekend, bringing Hook down to #2 at the US box office from its four-week stay at #1. The film lasted at #1 for four consecutive weeks, then was upended by Medicine Man, which was also released by Hollywood Pictures. By the end of its run, the film earned a total of $88 million in the United States and Canada and $52 million internationally, for a worldwide total of $140 million.

1994 to 2005: continued success 
In 1994, Hanson directed the adventure film The River Wild starring Meryl Streep, Kevin Bacon, and David Strathairn. It grossed a total of $94,216,343 worldwide, earning $46,816,343 in the United States and Canada and $47,400,000 internationally.

In 1997, Hanson directed the noir film L.A. Confidential. Prior to the Warner Brothers acquisition of the James Elroy novel L.A. Confidential, and his hiring as a writer and director, Hanson had been a long-time fan of the author. Regarding Elroy's characters, Hanson said "What hooked me on them was that, as I met them, one after the other, I didn't like them—but as I continued reading, I started to care about them." Ellroy's novel also made Hanson think about Los Angeles and provided him with an opportunity to "set a movie at a point in time when the whole dream of Los Angeles, from that apparently golden era of the '20s and '30s, was being bulldozed."

Hanson was subsequently joined by screenwriter Brian Helgeland who had lobbied to be its writer prior to the hiring of Hanson. They worked on the script together for two years, with Hanson turning down jobs and Helgeland writing seven drafts for free. Unknown Australian actors Russell Crowe and Guy Pearce were cast in leading part, Hanson explained that he wanted to "replicate my experience of the book. You don't like any of these characters at first, but the deeper you get into their story, the more you begin to sympathize with them. I didn't want actors audiences knew and already liked." L.A. Confidential was a critical and commercial success. It grossed $126 million against a $35 million budget and received acclaim from critics, with praise for the acting, writing, directing, editing, and Jerry Goldsmith's musical score. It was nominated for nine Academy Awards, including Best Picture, winning two: Best Supporting Actress (Basinger) and Best Adapted Screenplay. In 2015, the Library of Congress selected L.A. Confidential for preservation in the United States National Film Registry as "culturally, historically, or aesthetically significant".

In 2000 Hanson directed Wonder Boys, a comedy drama starring Michael Douglas and Tobey Maguire. After L.A. Confidential, Hanson was looking for his next project. Actress Elizabeth McGovern advised Hanson to work with screenwriter Steve Kloves. When he was given the writer's script for Wonder Boys and was told that Michael Douglas was interested in starring, he "fell in love with these characters – and they made me laugh." Hanson also identified with the main character and the "thing building up inside him: frustration, hunger, yearning, et cetera." One of the challenges for Hanson was to take a plot that, as he put it, "is meandering and, apparently, sort of aimless," and a character that "does things that even he doesn't really know why he's doing them," and try to create a "feeling of focus" to keep the audience interested. Another challenge the director faced was working in actual locations in very cold weather that was constantly changing. Hanson also considered Robert Downey Jr., who at the time had legal and personal problems, for a role. Downey met with Hanson where they addressed his problems. The actor demonstrated a commitment to the project and Hanson hired him. Reportedly, Downey acted professionally for the entire shoot. Hanson also contacted Dante Spinotti about working on the film in November 1998. In its opening weekend, Wonder Boys opened at No. 7 in the US and Canadian box office and grossed a total of US$5.8 million in 1,253 theaters. It went on to gross $19,393,557 there and $14,033,031 in other countries, for a worldwide total of $33,426,588. Based on a $55 million budget, the film was a box office bomb. The film received largely positive reviews from critics. Rotten Tomatoes reports an 81% "Fresh" rating, based on 125 reviews, with an average rating of 7.2/10. On Metacritic, the film has a 73 out of 100 score, based on 36 critics, indicating "generally favorable reviews".

In 2000, Hanson directed the music video "Things Have Changed" by Bob Dylan. The song-writer Clinton Heylin wrote "Things Have Changed" to demonstrates a close knowledge of the film Wonder Boys, for which it was written. The lyrics make reference to "dancing lessons", "the jitterbug rag" and dressing "in drag", all of which feature in the plot of the film. Hanson recalled: "I learned that Dylan might be interested in contributing an original song… So when I came back from filming in Pittsburgh, Bob came by the editing room to see some rough cut footage. I told him the story and introduced him to the characters. We talked about Grady Tripp and where he was in life, emotionally and creatively. Weeks later a CD arrived in the mail". For the music video, Hanson intercut footage of Dylan with sequences from the feature film, to suggest that Dylan was interacting with the film's characters.

In 2002, Hanson directed 8 Mile a semi-biographical hip hop drama film about and starring rapper Eminem. According to Paul Rosenberg (Eminem's manager) both Quentin Tarantino and Danny Boyle were considered to direct, while Boyle came close, Eminem felt he had a better connection with Hanson. It received positive reviews, with critics praising the music and Eminem's performance.

Also in 2002, Hanson directed Piddler on the roof an episode of the sitcom Greg the Bunny. Furthermore, he acted in Spike Jonze's Adaptation. 

In 2005, Hanson directed the comedy drama In Her Shoes, starring Cameron Diaz and Toni Collette. In Her Shoes has received generally positive reviews from critics. Rotten Tomatoes reported that 75% of critics gave the film positive reviews, based on 164 reviews, with an average rating of 6.8/10. The film opened at #3 at the U.S. box office, raking in $10,017,575 USD in its first opening weekend. Its worldwide gross totaled $83,697,473.

2007 to 2014: later projects and retirement 
In 2007, Hanson released Lucky You. Director Curtis Hanson developed the film with his producing partner Carol Fenelon, who was a regular competitor in poker tournaments. Hanson said, "Part of the reason for wanting to make the movie was that the poker world was different, interesting, and we had an affinity for it. But the other part of it was the emotional thing. The skills at the table — and in the movie business — are different from the qualities that you want running your personal life. That single-mindedness, the aggression, the duplicity or bluffing or whatever you want to call it, the lack of sympathy..." The film was initially set for release on December 16, 2005. However, the film sat on the shelf for two years and went through numerous release date changes as Warner Bros. mandated a half-dozen different cuts of the film in response to negative test screenings. Opening the same weekend as Spider-Man 3, the film debuted at $2.7 million in ticket sales; the lowest saturated opening week since 1982. It finished its theatrical run with $8,382,477 in total worldwide revenue. The film received generally negative reviews from critics. It holds a 28% approval rating based on 141 reviews on Rotten Tomatoes.

In 2010, Hanson served as an executive producer for Win-Loss and episode of the television show Three Rivers.

In 2011, Hanson directed the television film Too Big to Fail, based on the 2009 Andrew Ross Sorkin book of the same name about the beginnings of the financial crisis of 2007–2010. The film was produced by Hanson's production company Deuce Three Productions for HBO. The film received 11 nominations at the Emmy Awards, Hanson received a nomination for "Outstanding Directing For A Miniseries, Movie Or A Dramatic Special" and "Outstanding Miniseries or Movie". 

Also in 2011, Hanson served as a producer for David Frankel's film The Big Year.  

His last film was to be Chasing Mavericks in 2012. Michael Apted received director credit alongside Hanson after he took over as director during the last 15 days of principal photography, while Hanson recovered from complications arising from recent heart surgery. On Rotten Tomatoes it has an approval rating of 32% based on 81 reviews, with an average rating of 4.90/10. The site's consensus states: "It's sweet, gentle, and affably modest, but Chasing Mavericks is ultimately pulled under by an unconvincing script and a puzzling lack of energy."

In 2014, served as an executive producer for the pilot Hoke, which wasn't picked up for a series.

Moving forward, Hanson later retired from film work and was reported to have frontotemporal dementia.

Within his career, he was an active member of the Directors Guild of America, he was a member of the Creative Rights Committee, the President's Committee on Film Preservation, and the Film Foundation.

Personal 
Hanson had a son named Rio, with his partner Rebecca Yeldham.

Death
In 2016, Hanson died of natural causes at his Hollywood Hills home at the age of 71.

Influences and style 
Hanson said that he was heavily influenced by the directors Alfred Hitchcock and Nicholas Ray. In an interview with the New York Times in 2000, Hanson stated that Ray's film In a Lonely Place was among many that he watched in preparation for the filming of L.A. Confidential.

Filmography

Films

Other film work

Television

Music video 

 "Things Have Changed" for Bob Dylan (2000).

Awards and honors 
Hanson became one of the five directors (alongside Quentin Tarantino, Steven Soderbergh, David Fincher, and Barry Jenkins) to ever sweep "The Big Four" critics awards (LAFCA, NBR, NYFCC, NSFC).

1990s 
Bad Influence

 Nominated - Critics Award (Deauville Film Festival)

The Hand That Rocks the Cradle

 Grand Prix (Festival du Film Policier de Cognac)Audience Award (Festival du Film Policier de Cognac)

L.A. Confidential

 Academy Award for Best Adapted Screenplay
 Critics' Choice Movie Award for Best Screenplay
 Edgar Allan Poe Award for Best Motion Picture
 Satellite Award for Best Adapted Screenplay
 USC Scripter Award
 WGA Award for Best Adapted Screenplay
 Nominated - Palme d'Or
 Nominated - Academy Award for Best Picture
 Nominated - Academy Award for Best Director
 Nominated - BAFTA Award for Best Film
 Nominated - BAFTA Award for Best Direction
 Nominated - BAFTA Award for Best Screenplay
 Nominated - DGA Award for Outstanding Directing – Feature Film
 Nominated - Golden Globe Award for Best Director
 Nominated - Golden Globe Award for Best Screenplay
 Nominated - PGA Award for Best Theatrical Motion Picture
 Nominated - Satellite Award for Best Film
 Nominated - Satellite Award for Best Director

2000s 
8 Mile

 Nominated - European Screen International Award

Too Big to Fail

 Nominated - Primetime Emmy Award for Outstanding Directing for a Miniseries or Movie
 Nominated - Primetime Emmy Award for Outstanding Miniseries or Movie

References

External links

Frontotemporal Degeneration association

1945 births
2016 deaths
20th-century American male writers
21st-century American male writers
Best Adapted Screenplay Academy Award winners
Edgar Award winners
People with frontotemporal dementia
Film directors from Los Angeles
Film directors from Nevada
Screenwriters from California
Screenwriters from Nevada
Writers Guild of America Award winners
Writers from Reno, Nevada